Etthén Heldeli: Caribou Eaters is a Canadian documentary film, directed by Ian Toews and released in 2018. The film centres on the Dene people in northern Saskatchewan, and their traditional winter caribou hunt.

The film premiered October 21, 2018 on Citytv. It was subsequently screened at the Yorkton Film Festival in 2019, where it was a nominee for the Ruth Shaw Best of Saskatchewan and Best Multicultural Film awards.

The film received a Canadian Screen Award nomination for Best Documentary Program at the 8th Canadian Screen Awards in 2020.

References

External links
 

2018 films
2018 documentary films
2018 television films
Canadian documentary television films
Documentary films about First Nations
2010s English-language films
2010s Canadian films